The fourth series of the British sitcom series 'Allo 'Allo! contains six episodes which first aired between 7 November and 12 December 1987.

Series 4 marks the last regular appearance of Sam Kelly as Captain Hans Geering; though he returned for a one-off special appearance in series 7. Francesca Gonshaw left at the end of the third series; though the exit of her character, Maria, is not explained until the second episode of this series. This series also sees the first appearances of Sue Hodge as Mimi Labonq in the third episode, as the new café waitress; and in the same episode Gavin Richards as Captain Alberto Bertorelli, the seconded Italian captain.

The following episode names are the ones found on the British R2 DVDs with alternate region titles given below them.

Cast

Episodes

References

External links

1987 British television seasons
 4
'Allo 'Allo! seasons